Yahtzee is a dice game made by Milton Bradley (a company that has since been acquired and assimilated by Hasbro). It was first marketed under the name of Yahtzee by game entrepreneur Edwin S. Lowe in 1956. The game is a development of earlier dice games such as Poker Dice, Yacht and Generala. It is also similar to Yatzy, which is popular in Scandinavia.

The objective of the game is to score points by rolling five dice to make certain combinations. The dice can be rolled up to three times in a turn to try to make various scoring combinations and dice must remain in the box. A game consists of thirteen rounds. After each round, the player chooses which scoring category is to be used for that round. Once a category has been used in the game, it cannot be used again. The scoring categories have varying point values, some of which are fixed values and others for which the score depends on the value of the dice. A Yahtzee is five-of-a-kind and scores 50 points, the highest of any category. The winner is the player who scores the most points.

Yahtzee was marketed by the E.S. Lowe Company from 1956 until 1973. In 1973, the Milton Bradley Company purchased the E.S. Lowe Company and assumed the rights to produce and sell Yahtzee. During Lowe's ownership, over 40 million Yahtzee games were sold worldwide. According to the current owner, Hasbro, 50 million Yahtzee games are sold each year. A classic edition is currently being marketed by Winning Moves Games USA.

History

The overall concept of Yahtzee traces its roots to a number of traditional dice games. Among these are the game Generala, the German game of Kniffel and the English games of Poker Dice and Cheerio.

The most important predecessor of Yahtzee is the dice game Yacht, which is an English cousin of Generala and dates back to at least 1938. Wood classifies Yacht, and a similar three-dice game called Crag, as sequence dice games. Yahtzee is similar to Yacht in both name and content. Although Yahtzee is clearly derived from Yacht, it differed from it in a number of significant ways:
It introduced the upper section bonus.
It included the three-of-a-kind category.
In Yacht both straights are a sequence of five (Big Straight is 2–3–4–5–6, Little Straight is 1–2–3–4–5). Yahtzee introduced the sequence of four straight (the Small Straight).
It introduced Yahtzee bonuses and the Joker rule.
There were also a number of scoring differences.

The present-day commercial Yahtzee began when toy and game entrepreneur Edwin S. Lowe filed Yahtzee as a trademark with the U.S. Patent Office on April 19, 1956. The first commercial usage of the name Yahtzee was a few weeks earlier on April 3. Lowe classified his product as a Poker Dice Game. Lowe is also responsible for introducing Bingo to the U.S. market.

According to Hasbro, the game was invented by an anonymous Canadian couple, who called it The Yacht Game because they played it on their yacht with their friends. Later they asked Lowe if he would make up some sets to be given as gifts to their friends who enjoyed the game. Lowe perceived the possibility of marketing the game, and acquired the rights to the game from the couple in exchange for 1,000 gift sets. This story is expanded by Lowe in the 1973 book A Toy is Born by Marvin Kaye. According to Lowe, the game did not initially do well commercially, since the rules and appeal were not easily conveyed in an advertisement. Eventually, he had the idea of organizing Yahtzee parties at which people could play the game and thereby gain a first-hand appreciation of it. The idea was successful, and enthusiasts quickly popularized the game through word of mouth.

The E.S. Lowe Company sold Yahtzee from 1956 to 1973. During Lowe's ownership, a number of changes were made to the game's packaging, contents, and appearance. Between 1956 and 1961, the game's advertising slogan was changed from "The Game That Makes You Think While Having Fun" to "The Fun Game That Makes Thinking Fun!"

The game and its contents were copyrighted by Lowe in 1956, 1961, 1967, and 1972. In 1973, Milton Bradley purchased the E.S. Lowe Company and assumed the rights to produce and sell Yahtzee. During Lowe's ownership over 40 million Yahtzee games were sold in America and around the globe. The game has maintained its popularity. According to current owner Hasbro, 50 million Yahtzee games are sold each year.

Over time, the Yahtzee logo has taken several forms. The original version of the logo was used throughout the entire period that the game was produced solely by the Lowe company. After 1973, the logo changed various times. This logo is found on the scorecards and the game box(es).

A game called Yatzie was included in a game set called LUCK - 15 Grand Dice Games. Another game, Yap, shows close similarities to Yahtzee; this game was copyrighted by Robert Cissne in 1952.

Rules

The game consists of a number of rounds. In each round, a player gets three rolls of the dice, although they can choose to end their turn after one or two rolls. After the first roll the player can save any dice they want and re-roll the other dice. This procedure is repeated after the second roll. The player has complete choice as to which dice to roll. It is possible to re-roll both dice that were or were not rolled before.

The Yahtzee scorecard contains 13 different category boxes and in each round, after the third roll, the player must choose one of these categories. The score entered in the box depends on how well the five dice match the scoring rule for the category. Details of the scoring rules for each category are given below. As an example, one of the categories is called Three of a Kind. The scoring rule for this category means that a player only scores if at least three of the five dice are the same value. The game is completed after 13 rounds by each player, with each of the 13 boxes filled. The total score is calculated by summing all thirteen boxes, together with any bonuses.

The Yahtzee scorecard contains 13 scoring boxes divided into upper and lower sections.

Upper section
In the upper section there are six boxes. The score in each of these boxes is determined by adding the total number of dice matching that box.

If a player scores a total of 63 or more points in these six boxes, a bonus of 35 is added to the upper section score. Although 63 points corresponds to scoring exactly three-of-a-kind for each of the six boxes, a common way to get the bonus is by scoring four-of-a-kind for some numbers so that fewer of other numbers are needed. A player can earn the bonus even if they score a "0" in an upper section box.

In order to gauge how well a player is doing in the upper section, they often refer to being "up" or "down" compared to the average of three required for each box. So that if a player scores four "sixes" they will be "6 up"; while if they then score just two "twos" they will then be only "4 up". Similarly, if a player starts with two "twos" they will be "2 down".

Lower section
The lower section contains a number of poker-themed categories with specific point values:

Some players count a Yahtzee as being a valid Full House. However, the official rule is that a Full House is "three of one number and two of another". Small Straight and Large Straight are sometimes called Low and High, Short and Long Straight, or Little and Big Straights.

If a category is chosen but the dice do not match the requirements of the category the player scores 0 in that category. Some combinations offer the player a choice as to which category to score them under; e.g., a full house could be scored in the Full House, the Three-Of-A-Kind, or the Chance categories. The Chance category is often used for a turn that will not score well in any other category.

Yahtzee bonuses and Joker rules
A Yahtzee occurs when all five dice are the same. If the player throws a Yahtzee and has already filled the Yahtzee box with a score of 50, they score a Yahtzee bonus and get an extra 100 points. However, if they throw a Yahtzee and have filled the Yahtzee category with a score of 0, they do not get a Yahtzee bonus.

In either case they then select a category, as usual. Scoring is the same as normal except that, if the Upper Section box corresponding to the Yahtzee has been used, the Full House, Small Straight and Large Straight categories can be used to score 25, 30 or 40 (respectively) even though the dice do not meet the normal requirement for those categories. In this case the Yahtzee is said to act as a "Joker".

There are two alternative versions of the Joker rule used.

Forced Joker rule
In the official rules the player must act in the following way:

 If the corresponding Upper Section box is unused then that category must be used.
 If the corresponding Upper Section box has been used already, a Lower Section box must be used. The Yahtzee acts as a Joker so that the Full House, Small Straight and Large Straight categories can be used to score 25, 30 or 40 (respectively).
 If the corresponding Upper Section box and all Lower Section boxes have been used, an unused Upper Section box must be used, scoring 0.

Free choice Joker rule
In the simpler, alternative version of the Joker rule the player retains the free choice as to which category to use, but the Yahtzee can only be used as a Joker if the corresponding Upper Section box has been used. If the corresponding Upper Section box is unused the Yahtzee would score 0 if the Full House, Small Straight or Large Straight categories were chosen.

Original Joker rule
The original game rules released in 1956 contain a difference from the above rules. The booklet stated that additional Yahtzees must be used as Jokers in the Lower Section and did not allow for their use in the Upper Section. This rule was changed when the game was re-copyrighted in 1961.

The winner is the player with the highest total. The rules do not specify what happens in the event of a tie.

Strategies

Completing a Yahtzee
The probability of completing a Yahtzee depends on whether a particular Yahtzee is required or any Yahtzee.

Specific Yahtzee 
The probability of completing a specific Yahtzee is shown in the following table.

Any Yahtzee 
The probability of completing any Yahtzee is shown in the following table. The strategy is to keep any Yahtzee, four-of-a-kind, three-of-a-kind or pair that is thrown and re-roll the others. With two pairs, either can be chosen.

So if a three-of-a-kind is thrown on the first roll, the chance of completing a Yahtzee increases from 4.60% to 9.34%.

Final round 
This section describes the last round strategy where there is no possibility of a Yahtzee bonus (i.e. there is a score of 0 in the Yahtzee box). These are the simplest situations to analyze, although the strategy may vary depending on the game situation even at this late stage.

Upper Section box 
If the final box is in the upper section, the strategy is to keep any of the numbers required and re-roll the others. On average 2.11 of the number required will be gotten, scoring from 2.11 (for 1s) to 12.64 (for 6s). The distribution is as follows:

Three-Of-A-Kind 

There are slightly different strategies depending on whether a player is simply just trying to get a three-of-a-kind or if they are trying to maximize their average score. Different strategies will also be required should a specific target be needed to achieve.

The strategy to maximize the chance of getting a three-of-a-kind involves keeping any three-of-a-kind that is rolled. If a three-of-a-kind is rolled then after the first throw the player should keep any other 5s and 6s, while after the second throw the player should keep any other 4s, 5s, and 6s. An example is with 22225 the player keeps 2225 and throws the other 2. If a three-of-a-kind is not rolled the player should keep any pair that is rolled and re-roll the other dice, with two pairs the player should keep the higher pair, and with no pair the player should keep the highest die. Following this strategy gives a 74.32% chance of getting a three-of-a-kind.

This strategy does not maximize the average score since there are a few situations after the first throw where it is better to keep other combinations. For instance, after throwing 11166, keeping 11166 maximizes the chance of getting a three-of-a-kind (a guaranteed score of 15) but keeping 66 maximizes the expected average score (17.54), although it introduces a 25/81 ≈ 31% chance of scoring nothing. The situations where the strategy to maximize the average score differs are all after the first throw and are as follows: keep 33, 44, 55, 66 rather than 111 (or 11155, 11166), keep 4, 5, or 6 rather than 11, keep 5 or 6 rather than 22, keep 336 rather than 33. For example, with 22456 the player should keep 6 rather than 22 and with 33456 they should keep 336 not 33. If they follow the strategy to maximize the average score they will get a three-of-a-kind 71.51% of the time and score an average of 15.19.

Four-Of-A-Kind 

As with three-of-a-kind, there are slightly different strategies depending on whether a player is simply trying to get a four-of-a-kind or they are trying to maximize their average score. Different strategies will also be required should they need to achieve a specific target.

The strategy to maximize their chance of getting a four-of-a-kind involves keeping any four-of-a-kind that they have. If they have a four-of-a-kind then after the first throw they will keep the other if it is a 5 or 6, while after the second throw they will keep the die if it is a 4, 5, or 6. So that with 22223 they keep 2222 and will throw the 3. If they do not have a four-of-a-kind, the player should keep any three-of-a-kind or pair that they have and re-roll the other dice. With two pairs keep the higher pair. With no pair keep the highest die. Following this strategy provides a 29.08% chance of getting a four-of-a-kind.

As with three-of-a-kind, this strategy does not maximize the average score, since there are a few situations after the first throw where it is better to keep other combinations. For instance, after throwing 11166, keeping 111 maximizes the chance of getting a four-of-a-kind but keeping 66 maximizes the expected average score (6.20 rather than 4.18). The strategy to maximize the average score differs after the first throw and is as follows: keep 44, 55, 66 rather than 111, keep 4, 5, or 6 rather than 11, keep 6 rather than 22. Following the strategy to maximize the average score one will get a four-of-a-kind 27.74% of the time and score an average of 5.61.

Full House 

A player will keep a Yahtzee or Full House. A Yahtzee will score 25 under the Joker rule, even though it is not strictly a full house. Keep any four-of-a-kind, three-of-a-kind, or pairs that are thrown and re-roll the others. With two pairs keep both. On average one will succeed 36.61% of the time and score an average of 9.15.

Small Straight 

The strategy is complicated by the fact that, because of the Joker rule, the player will score 30 if a Yahtzee is rolled. One keeps any Small Straight or Yahtzee that is thrown. After the first throw keep a run of 3 or 3 out of 4 (e.g. 124) if one is rolled. Otherwise, keep a 3 or 4 (or both) and a 2 or 5 if one also has a 3 or 4 (e.g. with 11245 one will keep 24 but with 11255 one will keep nothing). Do not keep just 2, 5, or 25. The only difference after the second throw is that one keeps 1111, 2222, 5555 and 6666, and will try to throw a Yahtzee unless the other die is a 3 or 4.

On average one will succeed 61.60% of the time and score an average of 18.48.

Large Straight 

Again the strategy is complicated by the fact that, because of the Joker rule, one will score 40 if one gets a Yahtzee. One will keep any Large Straight or Yahtzee that is thrown. The best strategy is also to keep a four-of-a-kind and try to throw a Yahtzee, even after the first throw. The player should not keep a three-of-a-kind. Keep a small straight or 4 out of 5 (e.g. 1235). Otherwise one should simply keep any 2, 3, 4, or 5 (just one of each) so that with 12256 one would keep 25.

On average one will succeed 26.53% of the time and score an average of 10.61.

Yahtzee 

A player should keep any Yahtzee, four-of-a-kind, three-of-a-kind, or pair that is thrown and re-roll the others. On average one will succeed 4.60% of the time and score an average of 2.30.

Chance 

To get the maximum average score the strategy is straightforward. After the first throw, the player will keep any 5s and 6s. After the second throw one will keep any 4s, 5s, and 6s. On average one will score 23.33. Different strategies will be required when one needs to achieve a specific target.

Optimal strategy 
The strategy for maximising the expected score has been determined. The average score when using this strategy is 254.59. This average is based on calculations using the "free choice Joker rule".  Optimal strategy using the "forced Joker rule" has also been explored and the average score when using this strategy has been determined exactly as a rational number.

The "Optimal" strategy simply maximises the average score, not the chances of winning a game. There are two main reasons for this. Firstly, the Optimal strategy takes no account of any opponents. In normal gameplay a player will adjust their strategy depending on the scores of the other player or players.

Secondly, the Optimal strategy tends to give undue importance to Yahtzee bonuses. It is rare for a player without a Yahtzee bonus to beat a player with one. So, in normal gameplay, a player's strategy is not significantly influenced by the value given for a Yahtzee bonus. Consider the situation where the Yahtzee bonus was worth a million rather than a hundred. It would not influence normal gameplay where the objective is to score more than the opponent. It would, however, affect the "Optimal" strategy, though, since scoring a million would have a dramatic effect on the average score. The "Optimal" strategy would be dominated by the prospect of a Yahtzee bonus. Even with a Yahtzee bonus worth 100 the "Optimal" strategy tends to give too much importance to Yahtzee bonuses.

Despite these limitations, the "Optimal" strategy does provide a useful guide as to the best strategy, especially in the early rounds. The "Optimal" strategy for the first round is described in the next section. After the first round, the number of different games rapidly makes detailed analysis difficult, but, in the early rounds, players generally simply adapt the first-round strategy based on the boxes used. For instance, if a player throws 15566 in the first round, they will keep 66; however, if the 6s box was used in the first round and they throw 15566 in the second round, they will naturally keep 55 instead.

The following table shows the average score obtained using the Optimal strategy and the proportion of the time that zero is scored in a particular category:

The bonus is made in 68% of games, but in only 1% of games does the player get exactly 3-of-a-kind of each Upper Section category. In a further 5% of games, the player gets at least 3-of-a-kind in each of these categories and 4-of-a-kind in one or more of them. In the remaining 62% of games, there is at least one category which scores a pair or less but the bonus is achieved by scoring one or more 4-of-a-kind in the Upper Section. It is possible to calculate the maximum average score with different rules. When the rules are changed so that there is no Upper Section bonus the average score drops from 254.59 to 237.84, a reduction of 16.75. This compares with an average bonus score of 23.84 and shows that changes to the strategy to improve the chance of getting the bonus are to the detriment of the other scores; the average score in the other boxes drops by 7.09.

A Yahtzee is scored in about 34% of games while a Yahtzee bonus is scored in about 8% of games. A second Yahtzee bonus occurs about 1% of the time while a third one is scored in about 0.1% of games. The average number of Yahtzees thrown in a game is 0.46. This includes about 3% of games where a Yahtzee is thrown after 0 has been scored in the Yahtzee box and although it does score something, it is not scored as a Yahtzee or Yahtzee bonus.

In about 3.7% of games a Yahtzee is used as a Joker and scored on Full House, Small Straight or Large Straight. In most of these cases the Yahtzee box has a score of 50 and so the Yahtzee also counts as a Yahtzee bonus. In about a quarter of these cases the Yahtzee box has a score 0 and so there is no Yahtzee bonus.

Although the average score is 254.59 the Median score is 248. The Mode is 266, which occurs 1.26% of the time. The 1st Percentile is 151 (i.e. 1% of scores are 151 or less) while the 99th Percentile is 473 (i.e. 99% of scores are 473 or less).

First round 
Source:

The strategy for the first round described here is based on that used by the "Optimal" strategy. Sometimes there are two possible plays which are almost equally good. In these cases, the simplest option is given; i.e., the one that follows the general rules.

Although there are 7,776 different ways of throwing 5 dice, the order of the dice is not important due to the fact that roll order is irrelevant and that there are only 252 different combinations when you take order out of the equation. To use the strategy described therefore requires knowing 756 different situations.

Second and third roll choices
The general principle after the first and second throws is to keep the largest number of similar dice and rethrow the rest. When a player has a full house, keep the three-of-a-kind. With two pairs, keep the higher pair and rethrow the other three dice. If a large straight is rolled, keep it. If a small straight is rolled, keep it and re-roll the fifth die. If all the dice are different and there is no straight, keep only the 5. There are a number of exceptions to these rules. These exceptions are different for the second and third rolls.

Exceptions before the second roll:
with a full house containing three 1s, keep all the dice and put in the Full House box.
with 12344, keep the pair not the small straight.
with a 3456 and a pair, keep the pair not the small straight.
with a pair of 1s, keep, in order of preference, 345, 5, 4 or 6, not the pair of 1s.

So, before the second roll one will never keep two pairs, one will never keep a pair of 1s and one will never throw all the dice again.

Exceptions before the third roll:
with a full house containing three 1s, three 2s or three 3s, keep all the dice and put in the Full House box.
with a pair of 1s and a pair of 2s or with a pair of 1s and a pair of 3s, keep both pairs.
with 11345 keep 345 not the pair.
with 12456 keep 456 not just the 5.

So there are specific differences compared to the second roll. Now one will keep the Full House if the three-of-a-kind is 2 or 3 and keep two pairs when they are 1 and 2 or 1 and 3. Keep all large and small straights. One will normally keep a pair of 1s (although 345 is still better) and keep 456 rather than 5 when all the dice are different.

Category choice
In about 80% of games a player will either have at least a 3-of-a-kind or a straight. If one has any of the following put it in the appropriate Lower Section box: Yahtzee, full house, large straight, small straight. With a 4-of-a-kind or 3-of-a-kind put it in the appropriate Upper Section box. The only exception is that when one has a 3-of-a-kind where the sum of the dice is 25 or more one should use the 3-of-a-kind box. The 4-of-a-kind box is never used in the first round.

In the remaining 20% of cases one will have a poor hand: two pairs, one pair, or all dice different. In these situations there is no appealing option, the choice being between using an Upper Section box and using Chance. With two pairs follow the rule for the lower of the two pairs. The rule depends on whether the pair (or smaller pair) is low (1, 2 or 3) or high (4, 5 or 6):

with a low pair use the appropriate Upper Section box (1s, 2s or 3s) unless the sum of the dice is 22 or more, in which case use the Chance box.
with a high pair use the 1s box unless the sum of the dice is 20 or more, in which case use the Chance box. The only exception is that with 23446 one should use the Chance box even though it only scores 19.
with all dice different use the 1s box.

Best and worst outcome
The best outcome in the first round is to throw a Yahtzee and put it in the Yahtzee box. This increases the final expected score from 254.59 to 320.84. Putting a Yahtzee of 6s in the 6s box results in an expected score of just 279.48. The second best outcome is to score 24 in the 6s box. This provides an expected score of 268.23. Putting 56666 in the 4-of-a-kind box has an expected score of 264.54.

The worst first roll is 11236 which has an expected score of 249.83. After the second roll the worst position is 12356 which then has an expected score of 244.91. The worst third roll is 23446 which has an expected score of 238.96 when put in the Chance box.

Extreme scores

Maximum score 
The highest possible score is 1,575 and involves throwing 13 Yahtzees, scoring 12 Yahtzee bonuses of 100 points each, as well as 375 in the other categories.

The 375 is achieved by scoring five aces (5), five twos (10), five threes (15), five fours (20), five fives (25), five sixes (30), the Upper Section bonus (35), five sixes scored as Three-of-a-kind (30), five sixes scored as a four-of-a-kind (30), a full house (25), a small straight (30), a large straight (40), a Yahtzee (50), and five sixes scored as chance (30). The score of 1,575 requires using the "Joker" rules for the full house, small straight, and large straight categories.

In order to score 1,575 the player must throw 13 successive Yahtzees. The probability of scoring 1,575 is less than this, since to score the maximum one would need at least one of each number (after the first round) to fill the Upper Section and a further three 6 Yahtzees to score 30 in the three-of-a-kind, four-of-a-kind and chance categories. In about 18% of Yahtzees the player has some choice over the dice to keep. This most frequently happens when a player rolls two pairs. This means that a player can slightly increase the chance of getting a 6 Yahtzee without reducing the chance of getting a Yahtzee.

In normal gameplay the probability of scoring 1,575 is considerably less.

The highest possible score without a Yahtzee bonus is 351, which is achieved with scoring a five-of-a-kind as a Yahtzee, 84 in the Upper Section (four-of-a-kind in each category), and 29 in each of 3 of a kind, 4 of a kind, and Chance. The highest possible score without rolling a five-of-a-kind is 301. (In some sources, the technical high score when not taking a Yahtzee bonus is still the base 375 maximum, as described above.  In that case, you would score your 50 point Yahtzee score as your last roll having scored all of your other 5-of-a-kind in various Upper and Lower boxes along the way.  This is theoretical, however, as it's unlikely that anyone would score five sixes in the Chance box when the Yahtzee score was still open, e.g.)

Other high scores 
For a player following the strategy which maximises the chance of getting a Yahtzee, the probability of scoring a particular number of Yahtzees follows a binomial distribution and is shown in the following table.

A player must throw at least 8 Yahtzees in order to score 1000. Throwing 8 Yahtzees will score 750 for the Yahtzee and Yahtzee bonuses. The 7 Yahtzees after the first throw will generally score highly, including the opportunity of using the Joker rule to score in, for instance, the Large Straight category. This means that a player throwing 8 Yahtzees will often be able to score 1,000.

In normal gameplay the probability of scoring this number of Yahtzees is considerably less. The following table shows the probability of getting certain scores using the "Optimal" strategy.

Minimum score 
The lowest possible score is 5. The Chance box always scores the sum of the dice, so that a minimum of 5 must be scored in that category.

The strategy that works to maximize the average expected score will under worst case conditions score a minimum of 12 points, but cautious play will guarantee a minimum score of 18.

A score of 18 will be achieved if 11223 is thrown each round and then, whatever is re-thrown, getting 11223 again after the second and third throws, scoring 2 in the 1s box, 4 in the 2s box, 3 in the 3s box and 9 for the Chance category.

Scoring the minimum of 12, when attempting to maximise the average score, is less likely than scoring the maximum of 1,575 but is theoretically possible. Suppose that in the first two rounds a player gets 12355 after each roll. This would happen if a 12355 is thrown on the first roll and then, whatever dice are re-thrown, getting the same combination again; for instance, keeping 55, rethrowing the 123, and still getting 12355. The optimal strategy uses the 1s box in the first round, scoring 1, and the 2s box in the second round, scoring 2. Now suppose that for the next 3 rounds 11226 results after each roll. Once again, this is possible because 11226 may be thrown on the first roll and the same may be gotten when some of dice are re-thrown. The optimal strategy uses the four-of-a-kind and Yahtzees boxes in the third and fourth rounds and then the 3s box in the fifth round, scoring 0 each time. For the last 8 rounds, suppose 11223 is rolled each time. 0 is scored in all the remaining categories—except chance, where 9 is scored—giving a total of 12.

Commercial versions

Deluxe and collector editions
Deluxe edition games have been sold alongside the regular issue games since the early 1960s. They all contain components that are more luxurious than standard game parts. In recent years, a number of collector issue Yahtzees have been sold as well. Some of these collector issues have dice that replace the pips with certain symbols connected to a theme, but still correspond to the numbers one to six.

Travel Yahtzee

Since the 1970s, Travel Yahtzee has been sold in various forms as part of Milton Bradley's line of travel games.

 In the past, the travel form of Yahtzee was composed of the five dice contained in a special apparatus (see image at the right). "Rolling" the dice is initiated by turning the apparatus over, running it on one hand and turning it upright to see the faces of the dice. Dice to be saved for the next roll are locked by snapping the reverse of the apparatus.
 Currently, a zip-up cloth deluxe folio edition is sold. It consists of the set of dice, the cup, the scorecards and a tray for the dice to roll on, which includes a holder for the dice to be saved for the next roll. The cup has an oblong lip for easy storage.
 In addition to the game folio, Hasbro also released Yahtzee to Go. It comes with a dice cup that stores the dice and contents. This is similar to the original Travel Yahtzee only without the apparatus. This is sold in tandem with the game folio.
 There also exists a red circular travel edition, which includes the dice and scorecards as well as a collapsible cup and detachable dice holder. The bottom half of the case acts as a dice tray. This one uses a different logo from the standard one (the name of the game in uppercase with an exclamation point in front of a green oval) and it is sold outside the United States.
 There are also miniature versions of the game sold in sets contained either in cups that act as keychains (by the company Basic Fun)  or in specially shaped pens (by the company Stylus).

Electronic versions
Various Yahtzee console games have been sold over the years including an early version on the TI-99/4A computer as well as a 1978 version introduced on the Apple II computer. In 1996, the game was first released to PC and Mac users by Atari. The Ultimate Yahtzee CD-ROM game contained standard Yahtzee as well as other varieties. Later, GameHouse also released an authorized special version of the game for Windows users. It was re-released by Hasbro Interactive in 2001 with 700 free hours of AOL.

There are also several electronic versions of the game such as a handheld LCD version, and a cell phone version called Yahtzee Deluxe, which feature the original rules along with Duplicate and Rainbow modes, as well as independently produced versions for the Palm OS and Pocket PC and several cellphone models. The version for the Nintendo Game Boy was licensed from Hasbro and was produced by DSI Games and Black Lantern Studios Inc. It was sold in a three pack that included Life, Pay Day, and Yahtzee. The game has also been released for the iPod, iPod Touch and the iPhone, to be purchased through the iTunes Store,  as well as Google Play. Both the iOS App and the Android App are published by Scopely. Yahtzee is available on the Xbox 360 in the Family Game Night game by Hasbro. Pogo.com released a version in 2009, and the game is also available on the Pogo Facebook site as well.

Related games

A number of related games under the Yahtzee brand have been produced. They all commonly use dice as the primary tool for gameplay, but all differ generally. The first was Triple Yahtzee, developed in 1972. The game has inspired two short-lived television game shows: 1975's Spin-Off on CBS and 1988's syndicated Yahtzee.

Online versions
There are a large number of versions of Yahtzee which can be played online or are available to download.

 "Open Yahtzee" is a cross-platform open-source (free) version of Yahtzee for one player.
 "YachtC" is a commercially available free app on the Google Play Store. It has 3 variations: The traditional version, a "7-sided" dice version called "Lucky7", and a "TriColor" version similar to Kismet
"Gidd.io" is a free multiplayer platform where Yahtzee can be played online with up to 20 players.

Similar games
There are a large number of related games. Yatzy is one of the most popular. Yatzy rules and scoring categories are somewhat different from Yahtzee:
The bonus for reaching 63 or more points in the Upper Section is normally 50 points.
There are two extra boxes for the "One Pair" and "Two Pair" categories. These score the total of the pair(s) involved. For instance, 5-5-4-4-1 will score 10 points in the One Pair box and 18 in the Two Pair box. In the Two Pair category, the pairs must be different.
The Three-of-a-Kind and Four-of-a-Kind categories are scored using the total of the needed number of same-faced dice. For instance, 5-5-5-5-6 will score 20 points in Four-of-a-Kind and 15 points in Three-of-a-Kind. This scoring rule is the same as the Four-of-a-Kind scoring used in Yacht.
Full House scores the total of all dice, as in Yacht.
Small Straight and Large Straight have the same definitions as in Yacht. A Small Straight is 1-2-3-4-5 and scores 15 points (the total of the dice faces); the Large Straight is 2-3-4-5-6 and scores 20 points (again the combined value of the dice).
There are no Yahtzee bonuses or Joker rule. Yahtzees can be scored in other categories under the normal scoring rules. For example, a Yahtzee of sixes will score 12 in the One Pair box, 18 in Three-of-a-Kind, 24 in Four-of-a-Kind, 30 in Sixes or Chance and 0 in Two Pair, Full House, Small Straight and Large Straight boxes.

Other related games include:
 Balut is the name of a Danish dice game played by expatriates in many countries all over the world. The name of the game is taken from balut eggs.
 Kismet has dice with multiple-colored pips. Both numbers and colors are taken into account when scoring.
 Yamb has several (usually 4) columns filled with special restrictions and MINIMAX categories with the bigger score if the higher is difference between min and max.

Reviews
Games and Puzzles
1980 Games 100 in Games
 1981 Games 100 in Games
1982 Games 100 in Games
Jeux & Stratégie #16

References

External links
 Comprehensive information on rules, gameplay and strategy
 P-Yahtzee, Solution, Variants, Statistics, Tactics
 Regular and Alternative Yahtzee Rules

Sequence dice games
Milton Bradley Company games
IOS games
IPod games
1950s toys
Products introduced in 1956